William Fredrich Schroeder (born January 9, 1971) is a former American football wide receiver in the NFL. He attended Sheboygan South High School and then went on to the University of Wisconsin–La Crosse, where he starred in track and field. Schroeder joined the UW-La Crosse football team in only his fifth year of college after exhausting his eligibility to compete in track. Despite playing only one year, Schroeder's athleticism (4.26 second 40 yard dash and 44 inch vertical leap) drew the attention of NFL scouts.

Schroeder was drafted in the 6th round (181st overall) of the 1994 NFL Draft by the Green Bay Packers. He would wear jersey number 84. Schroeder spent the 1994 season on the practice squad, but was activated in the playoffs, though he did not have any receptions.  The following year, he was traded to the New England Patriots, but suffered a broken foot before he was able to play a single down and was released.  Then he went back to Green Bay, and after making the practice squad, he spent some time playing for NFL Europe before he finally made the active roster in the 1997 season.  That year, he was the team's leading punt and kick returner as they advanced to Super Bowl XXXII.  He went on to play until 2004. His best statistical season was 1999, when he caught 74 passes for 1,051 yards and 5 touchdowns. He last played with the Tampa Bay Buccaneers in 2004, wearing number 11 with the team as Joey Galloway had worn his traditional number of 84. On May 22, 2008 Schroeder informed Green Bay Packers general manager Ted Thompson that he would like to retire as a Packer. He signed with the Packers on May 21, 2008 and retired the next day. Schroeder was affectionately known as "The Sheboygan Flash", La Crosse Lightning, "Pro Bowl Bill" to many Packer fans.

NFL career statistics

Regular season

References

1971 births
Living people
American football wide receivers
Detroit Lions players
Green Bay Packers players
New England Patriots players
Rhein Fire players
Tampa Bay Buccaneers players
Wisconsin–La Crosse Eagles football players
Sportspeople from Eau Claire, Wisconsin
Players of American football from Wisconsin